Elfriedella   is a genus of flies in the family Tachinidae.

Species
Elfriedella amoena Mesnil, 1957
Elfriedella flavipilosa Shima, 1988

References

Diptera of Asia
Dexiinae
Tachinidae genera